The 1995 Cantabrian regional election was held on Sunday, 28 May 1995, to elect the 4th Regional Assembly of the autonomous community of Cantabria. All 39 seats in the Regional Assembly were up for election. The election was held simultaneously with regional elections in 12 other autonomous communities and local elections all throughout Spain.

The People's Party won the election, recovering much of the vote it had lost in 1991 to Hormaechea's Union for the Progress of Cantabria (UPCA), which fell to third place and lost over half of its seats and votes. The Spanish Socialist Workers' Party (PSOE), which in 1991 had won the regional election, collapsed and obtained its worst result until that time. The Regionalist Party of Cantabria (PRC) recovered and scored fourth with nearly 15% of the vote, while United Left (IU) entered the Assembly for the first time.

As a result of the election, José Joaquín Martínez Sieso from the People's Party was able to be elected as regional President thanks to a PP-PRC coalition agreement.

Overview

Electoral system
The Regional Assembly of Cantabria was the devolved, unicameral legislature of the autonomous community of Cantabria, having legislative power in regional matters as defined by the Spanish Constitution and the Cantabrian Statute of Autonomy, as well as the ability to vote confidence in or withdraw it from a President of the Regional Deputation. Voting for the Parliament was on the basis of universal suffrage, which comprised all nationals over 18 years of age, registered in Cantabria and in full enjoyment of their political rights.

The 39 members of the Regional Assembly of Cantabria were elected using the D'Hondt method and a closed list proportional representation, with an electoral threshold of five percent of valid votes—which included blank ballots—being applied regionally.

The electoral law provided that parties, federations, coalitions and groupings of electors were allowed to present lists of candidates. However, groupings of electors were required to secure the signature of at least 1 percent of the electors registered in Cantabria. Electors were barred from signing for more than one list of candidates. Concurrently, parties and federations intending to enter in coalition to take part jointly at an election were required to inform the relevant Electoral Commission within ten days of the election being called.

Election date
The term of the Regional Assembly of Cantabria expired four years after the date of its previous election. Elections to the Regional Assembly were fixed for the fourth Sunday of May every four years. The previous election was held on 26 May 1991, setting the election date for the Parliament on Sunday, 28 May 1995.

The Regional Assembly of Cantabria could not be dissolved before the date of expiry of parliament except in the event of an investiture process failing to elect a regional President within a two-month period from the first ballot. In such a case, the Regional Assembly was to be automatically dissolved and a snap election called, with elected deputies merely serving out what remained of their four-year terms.

Opinion polls
The table below lists voting intention estimates in reverse chronological order, showing the most recent first and using the dates when the survey fieldwork was done, as opposed to the date of publication. Where the fieldwork dates are unknown, the date of publication is given instead. The highest percentage figure in each polling survey is displayed with its background shaded in the leading party's colour. If a tie ensues, this is applied to the figures with the highest percentages. The "Lead" column on the right shows the percentage-point difference between the parties with the highest percentages in a poll. When available, seat projections determined by the polling organisations are displayed below (or in place of) the percentages in a smaller font; 20 seats were required for an absolute majority in the Regional Assembly of Cantabria.

Results

Aftermath

References
Opinion poll sources

Other

1995 in Cantabria
Cantabria
Regional elections in Cantabria
May 1995 events in Europe